The men's 10,000 metres event at the 2016 African Championships in Athletics was held on 22 June in Kings Park Stadium.

Results

References

2016 African Championships in Athletics
10,000 metres at the African Championships in Athletics